The 1830 Rhode Island gubernatorial election was an election held on April 21, 1830 to elect the Governor of Rhode Island. James Fenner, the incumbent governor and Jacksonian Party nominee, beat independent candidate Asa Messer with 61.87% of the vote.

General election

Candidates
James Fenner, Governor since 1824.
Asa Messer, President of Brown University from 1804 to 1826.

Results

References

Rhode Island gubernatorial elections
1830 Rhode Island elections
Rhode Island
April 1830 events